Mikheil Meskhi (born 30 October 1961 in Tbilisi; died 6 February 2003 in Tbilisi) was a Georgian football player.

Meskhi was son of former Dinamo Tbilisi player Mikheil Meskhi.

References

1961 births
2003 deaths
Footballers from Georgia (country)
Association football wingers
FC Dinamo Tbilisi players
Soviet Top League players
Footballers from Tbilisi
FC Spartak Moscow players